Lavaughan Venchael Booth (January 7, 1919 – November 16, 2002) was an influential Baptist leader in the United States. He founded the Progressive National Baptist Convention in 1961 and also established the Marva Collins Preparatory School. He was the pastor of Cincinnati's Zion Baptist Church for three decades and was the first African American trustee of the University of Cincinnati.

Booth was born in Collins, Mississippi. He graduated from Hopewell High School in Hopewell, Covington County, Mississippi in 1936 and has a bachelor's degree from Alcorn A&M (1940). He also studied at Gammon Theological Seminary and  graduated from Howard University's School of Religion in 1943 with honors and as president of his class.

References

1919 births
2002 deaths
People from Collins, Mississippi
University of Cincinnati trustees
African-American Baptist ministers
Alcorn State University alumni
Interdenominational Theological Center alumni
Howard University alumni
Baptists from Mississippi
20th-century African-American people
20th-century Baptist ministers from the United States